Ranoidea callista is a species of tree frog in the subfamily Pelodryadinae, endemic to Papua New Guinea. It has been observed on Mount Trafalgar, about 220 meters above sea level.

The author of the first formal description of Ranoidea callista, Fred Kraus, placed it in the same species group as Litoria gracilenta but noted its different coloration, different call, and the fact that it lays eggs in streams. It is likely to also be found in many other places in New Guinea and Australia as well.

References

callista
Amphibians of Australia
Amphibians described in 2013
Frogs of Australia
Amphibians of New Guinea